Westringia rubiifolia, also known as sticky westringia, is a species of plant in the mint family that is endemic to the Australian state of Tasmania.

Description
The species grows as a many-branched dense shrub to 0.3–1 m. The flowers are white to pale pink, with lilac dots.

Distribution and habitat
The species is widespread in Tasmania, occurring in wet eucalypt forests, along streams and in alpine areas.

References

rubiifolia
Lamiales of Australia
Flora of Tasmania
Taxa named by Robert Brown (botanist, born 1773)
Plants described in 1810